Sión Cóhen (born 30 November 1934) is a Panamanian wrestler. He competed in the men's freestyle light heavyweight at the 1964 Summer Olympics.

References

1934 births
Living people
Panamanian male sport wrestlers
Olympic wrestlers of Panama
Wrestlers at the 1964 Summer Olympics
Pan American Games bronze medalists for Panama
Pan American Games medalists in wrestling
Wrestlers at the 1963 Pan American Games
Place of birth missing (living people)
20th-century Panamanian people
21st-century Panamanian people